The Smithville Formation or Smithville Dolomite is a geologic formation in Arkansas. It preserves fossils dating back to the Ordovician period.

See also

 List of fossiliferous stratigraphic units in Arkansas
 Paleontology in Arkansas

References

 

Ordovician Arkansas
Ordovician Missouri
Ordovician southern paleotemperate deposits